This is a partial list of public art in the Derbyshire county of England. This list applies only to works of public art on permanent display in an outdoor public space. For example, this does not include artworks in museums.

Alfreton

Ashbourne

Belper

Bolsover

Buxton

Castleton

Chesterfield

Derby

Glossop

Matlock Bath

Swadlincote

References 

Derbyshire
Public art
Public art